The Thursby House located at Blue Spring State Park in Orange City, Florida, was constructed in 1872. The house was once a two-story structure built from three kinds of center-cut pine that had been milled in Savannah, Georgia, and transported by boat to the site.

Louis P. Thursby and his family settled on the inlet to Blue Springs, on the St. Johns River, in 1856. Shortly after his arrival, he constructed one of the first steamboat landings and planted one of the first orange groves on the upper St. Johns River. His first residence was a log cabin that he built.

Thursby's son added a third story and kitchen wing in 1900, which is still standing today.

A cypress water tank stood near the northeast corner of the house. The tank has recently been removed from its supports.

The Louis P. Thursby House is a historic home in Orange City. It is located inside Blue Spring State Park. On May 11, 2000, it was added to the U.S. National Register of Historic Places.

References

External links
 Volusia County listings at National Register of Historic Places

Houses on the National Register of Historic Places in Volusia County, Florida
Orange City, Florida
Houses completed in 1872
1872 establishments in Florida